This is presenting a complete list in alphabetical order of cricketers who have played for Central Zone in first-class, List A or Twenty20 matches since the team was formed ahead of the 2012–13 season for the first Bangladesh Cricket League (BCL) competition. Central Zone is a composite regional team which combines two divisional teams, Dhaka Division and Dhaka Metropolis. Complying with other team lists, details are the player's name followed by his years active as a Central Zone player, current players to the end of the 2015–16 season.

A
 Abdul Mazid (2013/14 to 2014/15)
 Abu Hider (2014/15)
 Al-Amin Hossain (2015/16)
 Arafat Sunny (2013/14)
 Asif Ahmed (2012/13 to 2013/14)

D
 Dewan Sabbir (2014/15 to 2015/16)
 Dhiman Ghosh (2014/15)

E
 Elias Sunny (2012/13 to 2014/15)

M
 Mahmudullah (2012/13 to 2014/15)
 Marshall Ayub (2012/13 to 2015/16)
 Mehrab Hossain (2012/13 to 2015/16)
 Mohammad Ashraful (2012/13)
 Mohammad Shahid (2013/14 to 2015/16)
 Mohammad Sharif (2012/13 to 2015/16)
 Mosharraf Hossain (2012/13 to 2015/16)

N
 Nadif Chowdhury (2014/15)
 Nurul Hasan (2012/13 to 2013/14)

R
 Raqibul Hasan (2012/13 to 2015/16)
 Rony Talukdar (2013/14 to 2015/16)

S
 Saikat Ali (2015/16)
 Sajidul Islam (2015/16)
 Shahadat Hossain (2012/13 to 2013/14)
 Shohidul Islam (2014/15 to 2015/16)
 Shahriar Nafees (2013/14)
 Shamsur Rahman (2012/13 to 2015/16)
 Sharifullah (2014/15 to 2015/16)
 Shuvagata Hom (2012/13 to 2015/16)

T
 Talha Jubair (2012/13)
 Tanveer Haider (2014/15 to 2015/16)
 Taskin Ahmed (2012/13 to 2014/15)

Z
 Zabid Hossain (2014/15 to 2015/16)

References

Central Zone